Yoder is an unincorporated town in Pleasant Township, Allen County, in the U.S. state of Indiana.

History
The Yoder post office was established in 1934. Yoder, once known as Sheldon, was renamed by the railroad.

References

Unincorporated communities in Allen County, Indiana
Unincorporated communities in Indiana
Fort Wayne, IN Metropolitan Statistical Area